Los Sauces is a Chilean town and commune in the Malleco Province, Araucanía Region.

Demographics
Of these, 3,638 (48%) lived in urban areas and 3,943 (52%) in rural areas. Between the 1992 and 2002 censuses, the population fell by 15.7% (1,414 persons).

Administration
As a commune, Los Sauces is a third-level administrative division of Chile administered by a municipal council, headed by an alcalde who is directly elected every four years. The 2008-2012 alcalde is Ramón Vilches Álvarez (PDC), and the council has the following members:
 Jaime Badilla E. (Ind./RN)
 Nelda Gallegos (RN)	
 Pedro Carrillo F. (UDI)
 Eva Calderón M. (PDC)
 Victor Gonzalez (UDI)
 Jose Ortega E. (PDC)

Within the electoral divisions of Chile, Los Sauces is represented in the Chamber of Deputies by Gonzalo Arenas (UDI) and Mario Venegas (PDC) as part of the 48th electoral district, together with Angol, Renaico, Collipulli, Ercilla, Purén, Lumaco and Traiguén. The commune is represented in the Senate by Alberto Espina Otero (RN) and Jaime Quintana Leal (PPD) as part of the 14th senatorial constituency (Araucanía-North).

References

External links
 Municipality of Los Sauces

Communes of Chile
Populated places in Malleco Province